The Loening PA-1 (Pursuit-Air cooled) was an American fighter aircraft prototype built by Loening Aeronautical Engineering.

Development
The PA-1 was a single-seat biplane with N-struts powered by a Wright R-1454 radial engine, an all-wood fuselage and wings with fabric coverings. The USAAS ordered two prototypes. The sole prototype first flew in March 1922, was found to have poor performance, so the construction of the second prototype was cancelled.

Specifications

References

Notes

Bibliography

PA-01
Loening PA-01
Single-engined tractor aircraft
Biplanes